The heroic lay (German Heldenlied) is a genre of Germanic epic poetry characteristic of the Migration Period and the Early Middle Ages. A lay is a short narrative poem of between 80 and 200 lines concerning a single heroic episode in the life of a warrior from Germanic legend.  It is distinct from the heroic epic (Beowulf, Nibelungenlied) which combines a sequence of episodes into a longer narrative.

Examples
Old High German
The Hildebrandslied
Old Norse
Atlakviða
Hamðismál
Old English
The Finnesburg Fragment

Notes

References

Further reading

 

Medieval poetry
Genres
Old High German literature
Germanic heroic legends